Blackwells Mills is an unincorporated community and census-designated place (CDP) located in Franklin Township in Somerset County, New Jersey. As of the 2010 U.S. census, the CDP's population was 803.

History
Blackwells Mills is on the east side of the Millstone River in Franklin Township, Somerset County, New Jersey. A mill was built in 1746 by Peter Schenk. His daughter married a Mercer and the mill passed to her family. The mill was purchased by William Blackwell in 1804 with his uncle Capt. Jacob Blackwell.  These men were from nearby Hopewell Township. William Blackwell built a fine Federal period house on the land across the road on the Hillsborough side.  Following Hurricane Floyd, the house was moved westward to higher ground.  It is still standing.   Following the death of William Blackwell in the 1850s, his son John came into possession of the mill.  John Blackwell died early in life, and his widow sold the mill to Augustus VanZant in 1872. On May 31, 1771 the west bank of the Millstone River became  Hillsborough Township, Somerset County, New Jersey.

The mill burned down in 1885 and was rebuilt. A major restoration was done in 1943.

Geography
According to the U.S. Census Bureau, Blackwells Mills had a total area of 1.296 square miles (3.356 km2), including 1.222 square miles (3.165 km2) of land and 0.074 square miles (0.191 km2) of water (5.70%).

Demographics

Census 2010

Blackwells Mills Canal House
The Blackwells Mills Canal House, located at Blackwells Mills Road and Canal Road along the Delaware and Raritan Canal, was built , at the same time as the canal. It was constructed to house the bridge tender, who would open the swing bridge when canal boats came through, then close it to allow traffic to cross over the canal. It is a contributing property of the Delaware and Raritan Canal historic district, added to the National Register of Historic Places on May 11, 1973.

References

Census-designated places in Somerset County, New Jersey
Franklin Township, Somerset County, New Jersey